First Falls may refer to:

 Yalesville, Connecticut, a village in Wallingford, Connecticut, formerly known as First Falls
 First Falls (Adelaide Hills, South Australia), a plunge waterfall
 First Falls (City of Burnside, South Australia), a cascade waterfall
 First Falls (Yarmouth, Maine), a waterfall